Gianluigi Scalvini (born 14 April 1971 in Brescia) is an Italian former Grand Prix motorcycle road racer. His best year was in 1999 when he won two Grand Prix races and finished sixth in the 125cc world championship. Scalvini won two Grand Prix races during his career.

References 

1971 births
Living people
125cc World Championship riders
250cc World Championship riders
Italian motorcycle racers
Sportspeople from Brescia